LAV or Lav may refer to:

Persons 
 Lav, an alternative name for Lava (Ramayana), a son of the Hindu deity Rama and his wife Sita, whose story is told in the Ramayana
 Lav, translation in some Slavic languages of the name Lev
 Luis Antonio Valencia, Manchester United winger
 Lav (singer), the stage name of American singer-songwriter Kalea Little.

Science and technology 
 Lavalier microphone, a small microphone with a clip for attaching to clothing
 software packages for encoding and decoding video and audio files:
 LAV Filters, a set of open-source DirectShow filters based on FFmpeg
 Libav, a free software project forked from FFmpeg
 libavcodec, an audio/video codec library provided by FFmpeg and Libav
 Live Attenuated vaccine, a vaccine with weakened but still living pathogen
 Load average, the average of Load (computing)
 Local As View, a view-based query answering approach to data integration
 Lymphadenopathy-associated virus, a former name for HIV (human immunodeficiency virus)

Vehicles 
 Leisure activity vehicle, a car classification
 Light Armored Vehicle, another term for Armored car (military)
LAV (armoured vehicle), series of armored vehicles made by General Dynamics Land Systems, Canada
 LAV I, or Armoured Vehicle General Purpose 6x6
 LAV II, 8x8 vehicle
 LAV-25, used by the United States Marine Corps
 LAV III, 8x8 vehicle
 LAV 6, modernization of the LAV III

Transportation lines 
 Línea Aeropostal Venezolana, an airline of Venezuela
 Líneas de Alta Velocidad, Spanish high-speed railway lines
 Madrid–Seville high-speed rail line
 Madrid–Barcelona high-speed rail line
 Madrid–León high-speed rail line
 Madrid–Levante high-speed rail network
 Córdoba–Málaga high-speed rail line
 Antequera–Granada high-speed rail line

Other uses
 Lav, Iran, a village in Isfahan Province, Iran
 Lav pivo, a beer brand in Serbia
 The Last American Virgin, a 1982 film
 Let America Vote, a political action organization fighting voter suppression